is a Japanese actor and film director. Born in Kasugai, Aichi, he was nominated for the Best Actor award at the 1990 Japanese Academy Awards for his performance in Sen no Rikyu. He won the award for best actor at the 37th Blue Ribbon Awards for Like a Rolling Stone.

He made his directing debut in 2001, and has taken leading roles in front of the camera in the three films he has directed as of 2006.

He appeared in the Brazilian soap opera Morde & Assopra, of 2011, as a scientist in the first chapter. He also appeared in the film Dirty Hearts, also released in 2011, this time as the character Colonel Watanabe, officer of the  Japanese Imperial Army, leader of Shindo Renmei and the great villain of the film

Selected filmography

Actor

Films
1986 The Sea and Poison, Suguro
1989 Death of a Tea Master
1991 The Pianist
1992 Luminous Moss
1994 Like a Rolling Stone
1998 Pride, Ichirō Kiyose
1999 Minazuki
2001 An Adolescent
2004 Runin: Banished
2005 Yamato, Captain Kōsaku Aruga
2006 A Long Walk
2009 Goemon, Toyotomi Hideyoshi
2009 Be Sure to Share
2011 Dirty Hearts
2012 Rurouni Kenshin, Yamagata Aritomo
2015 Blood Bead
2016 64: Part I, Arakida
2016 64: Part II, Arakida
2016 If Cats Disappeared from the World
2016 The Old Capital
2018 Smokin' on the Moon
2018 Samurai's Promise
2019 According To Our Butler, Ōtori
2019 Diner
2019 Born Bone Born
2019 Iwane: Sword of Serenity
2020 One in a Hundred Thousand
2020 Independence of Japan
2021 Peaceful Death
2021 Nishinari Goro's 400 Million Yen
2021 Detective Chinatown 3
2021 99.9 Criminal Lawyer: The Movie, Shūichi Ōtomo
2021 1921
2022 Niwatori Phoenix
2022 Akira and Akira, Kazuo Haneda
2022 Goodbye Cruel World, Yakuza boss
2023 Kumo to Saru no Kazoku

Television
1976 Enban Sensō Bankid - Noboru Tenma/Bankid Pegasus
1983 Tokugawa Ieyasu – Matsudaira Katsutaka
1984–85 Miyamoto Musashi – Hon'iden Matahachi
1987 Dokuganryū Masamune – Ishida Mitsunari
1994 Hana no Ran – Ikkyū
2013 Yae no Sakura – Sakuma Shōzan
2015 Hana Moyu – Tamaki Bun'noshin
2015 Keisei Saimin no Otoko Part 2 – Kiyochika Iwashita
2016 Kyoaku wa Nemurasenai – Kiichi Hase
2017 Black Leather Notebook – Kenji Narabayashi
2019 An Artist of the Floating World
2019 Manpuku
2023 Ranman – Ōhata Gihei

Director
2001 Shōjo a.k.a. An Adolescent
2004 Runin: Banished
2006 A Long Walk
2008 Kaze no sotogawa a.k.a. Out of the Wind
2013 Kyoko to Shuichi no baai a.k.a. Case of Kyoko, Case of Shuichi

Dubbing
1980 The Empire Strikes Back a.k.a. Luke Skywalker (Mark Hamill)
1982 A New Hope a.k.a. Luke Skywalker (Mark Hamill)

Personal life
Okuda is married to writer Kazu Andō and they have two daughters, film director Momoko Ando and actress Sakura Ando.

References

External links

1950 births
Living people
Japanese male actors
Japanese film directors
People from Kasugai, Aichi